Phyle ("tribe, clan"; pl. phylai, φυλαί; derived from ancient Greek φύεσθαι "to descend, to originate") is an ancient Greek term for tribe or clan. Members of the same phyle were known as symphyletai, literally: fellow tribesmen. They were usually ruled by a basileus. Some of them can be classified by their geographic location: the Geleontes, the Argadeis, the Hopletes, and the Agikoreis, in Ionia; the Hylleans, the Pamphyles, the Dymanes, in the Dorian region.

Attic tribes
The best-attested new system was that created by Cleisthenes for Attica in or just after 508 BC. The landscape was regarded as comprising three zones: urban (asty), coastal (paralia) and inland (mesogeia). Each zone was split into ten sections called trittyes ('thirdings'), to each of which were assigned between one and ten of the 139 existing settlements, villages or town-quarters, which were henceforth called demoi. 

Three sections, one each from urban, coastal and inland, were then put together to form a tribe. The 30 sections therefore yielded ten tribes, each named after a local hero and each with a geographically scattered membership roughly equal in size and hereditary in the male line thenceforward. They rapidly took on various functions.

They became the brigading units for the army; constituencies for the election of magistrates, especially the ten generals (strategoi), for the section of members of the Council of 500 (boule) and of the 6,000 jurors, and for the selection of boards of administrative officials of every kind: and bases for the selection of competing teams of runners, singers or dancers at various festivals. They had their own corporate life, with officials and sanctuaries, and came to have an official order: 1. Erechtheis (Ἐρεχθηΐς), 2. Aigeis (Αἰγηΐς), 3. Pandionis (Πανδιονίς), 4. Leontis (Λεοντίς), 5. Acamantis (Ἀκαμαντίς), 6. Oineis (Οἰνηΐς), 7. Kekropis (Κεκροπίς), 8. Hippothontis (Ἱπποθοντίς), 9. Aiantis (Αἰαντίς) and 10. Antiochis (Ἀντιοχίς).

Ten tribes of Thurii
When the colony of Thurii on the Gulf of Taranto was settled under the support of Pericles and the command of Lampon and Xenocritus the population was organized in ten tribes, following the Athenian organization: there were tribes for the population of  1. Arcadia, 2. Achaea, 3. Elis, 4. Boeotia, 5. Delphi, 6. Dorians, 7. Ionians, 8. population of Euboea, 9. the islands and 10. Athenians.

References

Sources 
 
 Traill, John S., The political organization of Attica: a study of the demes, trittyes, and phylai, and their representation in the Athenian Council, Princeton : American School of Classical Studies at Athens (ASCSA), 1975 

Society of ancient Greece